Juju Stories is a three-part anthology film exploring juju (magical) stories rooted in Nigerian folklore and urban legend, written and directed by C.J. Obasi, Abba Makama and Michael Omonua. The film features three stories: "Love Potion" by Omonua, "YAM" by Makama, and "Suffer The Witch" by Obasi. It is scheduled for theatrical release in Nigeria on 21 January 2022.

Cast 

 Belinda Agedah Yanga as Mercy
Paul Utomi as Leonard
Elvis Poko as Tohfik
Don Ekwuazi as Amos
Nengi Adoki as Joy
Bukola Oladipupo as Chinwe
Timini Egbuson as Ikenna

Plot Summary 
Juju Stories tackles juju in contemporary Lagos through three stories. In Love Potion, by Omonua, an unmarried woman agrees to use juju to find herself an ideal mate. In Yam, by Makama, consequences arise when a street urchin picks up seemingly random money from the roadside. In Suffer the Witch, by Obasi, love and friendship turns into obsession, when a young college woman attracts her crush's interest.

Reception 
Juju Stories first premiered at the 2021 edition of the Locarno Film Festival. It won the Boccalino d'Oro award for best film. It is scheduled for theatrical release in 12 countries on 31 October 2021. It was listed as one of the best African films of 2022.

Awards and recognition

References

External links 
 

Nigerian horror films
2022 in Nigerian television
English-language Nigerian films
2020s English-language films
Films based on African myths and legends